A punch line (a. k. a. punch-line or punchline) concludes a joke; it is intended to make people laugh. It is the third and final part of the typical joke structure. It follows the introductory framing of the joke and the narrative which sets up for the punch line.

In a broader sense, "punch line" can also refer to the unexpected and funny conclusion of any performance, situation or story.

Etymology 
The origin of the term is unknown. Even though the comedic formula using the classic "set-up, premise, punch line" format was well-established in Vaudeville by the beginning of the 20th century, the actual term "punch line" is first documented in the 1920s; the Merriam-Webster dictionary pegs the first use in 1921.

Linguistic analysis 
A linguistic interpretation of the mechanics of the punch line response is posited by Victor Raskin in his script-based semantic theory of humor. Humor is evoked when a trigger, contained in the punch line, causes the audience to abruptly shift its understanding of the story from the primary (or more obvious) interpretation to a secondary, opposing interpretation. "The punch line is the pivot on which the joke text turns as it signals the shift between the [semantic] scripts necessary to interpret [re-interpret] the joke text." To produce the humor in the verbal joke, the two interpretations (i.e., scripts) need to be both compatible with the joke text and opposite or incompatible with each other. Thomas R. Shultz, a psychologist, independently expands Raskin's linguistic theory to include "two stages of incongruity: perception and resolution". He explains that "incongruity alone is insufficient to account for the structure of humour. [...] Within this framework, humour appreciation is conceptualized as a biphasic sequence involving first the discovery of incongruity followed by a resolution of the incongruity." Resolution generates laughter.

Prosodic features 
There are many folk theories of how people deliver punchlines, such as punchlines being louder and at a higher pitch than the speech preceding it, or a dramatic pause before the punchline is delivered. In laboratory settings, however, none of these changes are employed at a statistically significant level in the production of humorous narratives. Rather, the pitch and loudness of the punchline are comparable to those of the ending of any narrative, humorous or not.

Jokes without a punch line 
In order to better elucidate the structure and function of the punch line, it is useful to look at some joke forms that purposely remove or avoid the punch line in their narrative. Shaggy dog stories are long-winded anti-jokes in which the punch line is deliberately anticlimactic. The humor here lies in fooling the audience into expecting a typical joke with a punch line. Instead they listen and listen to nothing funny and end up themselves as the butt of the joke.

Another type of anti-joke is the nonsense joke, defined as having "a surprising or incongruous punch line", which provides either no resolution at all or only a partial, unsatisfactory resolution. One example of this is the no soap radio punch line: "Two elephants were taking a bath. One said, 'Please pass the soap.' The other replied, 'No soap, radio." Here the anticipated resolution to the joke is absent and the audience becomes the butt of the joke.

Jab lines 
A joke contains a single story with a single punch line at the end. In the analysis of longer humorous texts, an expanded model is needed to map the narratological structure. With this in mind, the general theory of verbal humor (GTVH) was expanded to include longer humorous texts together with jokes, using the GTVH narrative structure to categorize them. A new term "jab line" was introduced to designate humor within the body of a text, as opposed to the punch line, which is always placed at the end. The jab line is functionally identical to the punch line, except that it can be positioned anywhere within the text, not just at the end. "Jab and punch lines are semantically indistinguishable (...), but they differ at a narratological level." Additionally, "jab lines are humorous elements fully integrated in the narrative in which they appear (i.e., they do not disrupt the flow of the narrative, because they either are indispensable to the development of the 'plot' or of the text, or they are not antagonistic to it)".

Using the expanded narrative structure of the GTVH and this new terminology of jab lines, literature and humor researchers now have a single theoretical framework, with which they can analyze and map any kind of verbal humor, including novels, short stories, TV sitcoms, plays, movies as well as jokes.

Three-part structure 
Felicitous jokes are often formatted in a style called AAB, where a joke is made up of a set of three, the first two of which share some common attribute, and the third represents a deviation from that attribute. Under these conditions, the third item in the set—the B—is the punchline.

Rozin gives the following example as exemplifying this structure:

According to this theory, the punchline is always the deviation, and it does not matter how many instances of A occur for there to be a punchline. However, jokes following the AAB structure are consistently rated as being funnier than their AB or AAAB counterparts.

Footnotes

References 
 
 
 
 
 
 
 

Comedy
Storytelling